Kandakovka is a rural locality (a village) in Kusekeyevsky Selsoviet, Birsky District, Bashkortostan, Russia. The population was 324 as of 2010. There are 5 streets.

Geography 
Kandakovka is located 7 km southwest of Birsk (the district's administrative centre) by road. Shamsutdin is the nearest rural locality.

References 

Rural localities in Birsky District